Yarrow Reservoir - named after the River Yarrow - is a reservoir in the Rivington chain in Anglezarke, Lancashire, England, and has a storage capacity second to Anglezarke Reservoir. Construction of the reservoir, designed by Liverpool Borough Engineer Thomas Duncan, began in 1867.

In 2002, several tons of fish were transported to this reservoir when the Upper Rivington reservoir was completely drained for essential maintenance work.

The construction of Yarrow Reservoir was described in Wm. Fergusson Irvine's book "A Short History Of The Township Of Rivington" :

On the banks of the reservoir is a 'face in the wall' - an effigy carved into a large stone on top of the dry stone wall, which is said to depict an inspector who worked for the Liverpool Corporation and made workers' lives a misery.

The construction of the reservoir meant that a small hamlet called Alance was flooded, centred on the rebuilt Alance Bridge, and a large dwelling was demolished - Turner's Farm - which lives on in current maps only in name as Turner's Embankment.

References

Reservoirs in Lancashire
Rivington